Malaimagen (born Guillermo Nicolás Galindo Kuscevic, 1 May 1981, Santiago de Chile) is a Chilean cartoonist. He studied Graphic Design at Metropolitan University of Technology (UTEM).

Career`

In 2007, Kuscevic created a blog to publish his cartoons, then adopted the nickname Malaimagen (Bad Image).

In 2008, Malaimagen began to work as an artist for the magazine Cañamo. He worked there until 2012.

In 2011, he began to make cartoon parodies of the political program Tolerancia Cero, which were published in the Chilean magazine The Clinic. These comics became popular across social networks.

In 2014, Malaimagen created an animated video for a song by the singer Anita Tijoux and an exposition together with the draftsman Guillo, one of the most important proponents of graphic humour in Chile.

Works
La cuenta por favor (2009)
Abajo las manos (2010)
Voy saliendo (2011)
Pase usted (2012)
5 segundos (2012)
Sin tolerancia (2013)
Pan y circo (2014)
Boleta o Factura (2016)
Malditos humanos (2016)

References

External links
 Official Website
 La cuenta, por favor: Malaimagen 
 Exquisitamente fome
 Malaimagen humor y sátira de la vida diaria
 La importancia de reír
 Humor gráfico, ilustración de la realidad
 Malaimagen: LA VIÑETA que me quita mis invitados!
 Malaimagen
 Malaimagen vuelve al papel
 Mala Imagen: “Creo que este gobierno ha sido asqueroso y los de la Concertacion fueron asquerosos”
 Entrevista a Carolina Cádiz y Malaimagen
 Creador de Malaimagen: No me siento tan espectacular como dibujante, pero eso no es lo más relevante
 Malaimagen y su libro sobre Tolerancia Cero: “Piñera es lo mejor que le podría haber pasado a un dibujante de humor político”
 Entrevista a malaimagen: “El humor gráfico no puede censurarse desde el autor”
 La mala imagen del humor gráfico chileno 
 Malaimagen: el quinto panelista de Tolerancia Cero
 El lado serio del humor gráfico chileno
 Entrevista a Mala Imagen: "Para la pega me gusta más el estudiante anónimo, que el líder estudiantil"
 Malaimagen, dibujante: “Piñera era como un guionista de humor”
 Malaimagen: “Con Piñera, los chistes se inventaban solos” 
 Conversamos con Guillermo Galindo, el hombre tras Malaimagen 
 El no arte de malaimagen
 Malaimagen, el ilustrador de mirada aguda que lleva la política chilena al papel
 Guillermo Galindo Kuscevic “Malaimagen” “Uno no puede contenerse en el humor gráfico”
 Malaimagen: “Chile es un país muy contenido”

1981 births
Living people
Chilean cartoonists
People from Santiago